This is a list of universities in Guinea-Bissau:

Universities
 Universidade Amílcar Cabral (Amílcar Cabral University)
 Universidade Colinas de Boé (University of Colinas de Boé)
 Universidade Lusófona (an extension of the Portuguese university of the same name)
 Universidade Jean Piaget (an extension of the Portuguese Instituto Jean Piaget)
 Universidade Católica da Guiné-Bissau (Catholic University of Guinea Bissau)
 Higher School of Education of Guinea-Bissau
 National School of Health of Guinea-Bissau

Universities in Guinea-Bissau
Universities
Guinea-Bissau
Guinea-Bissau
Universities